TIGCC (from "TI" and "GCC") is a software development environment which allows developers to program and compile A68K assembly, GNU assembly, and C code for the Motorola 68000 series Texas Instruments graphing calculators (TI-89 (Titanium), TI-92 Plus and Voyage 200, as well as experimental support for the TI-92 with the Fargo shell). TIGCC is licensed under the GNU General Public License.

Various parts of TIGCC
The TIGCC project includes many things that help developers create and manage projects.
 TIGCC IDE (for Windows) - an integrated development environment with the TIGCC compiler and documentation included. It is written in Delphi. It includes syntax editing and is also a project manager that helps to keep projects together. As of version 0.96-beta8 the Windows IDE supports the latest version of TiEmu 3 for debugging via OLE Automation.
 KTIGCC - the Linux IDE, KTIGCC is similar to the Windows IDE. It runs under X11 using the KDE libraries and has a few new features such as linking to real calculators with the latest libticables2.
 Documentation - The TIGCC manual contains detailed documentation on how to use the TIGCC IDE and compiler, and documents all the TIGCC functions with detail.
 Compiler - The TIGCC compiler is a patched version of GCC that allows developers to compile C and assembly code for the m68k Texas Instruments graphing calculators.

Development of TIGCC

Development of the TIGCC project has decreased drastically recently due to the departure of many team members. While TIGCC is still quite active, it is not growing as fast as it once was. 
 TIGCC IDE - Development of the Windows IDE has mostly halted due to the lack of a Delphi programmer, though bugs are still fixed and small adjustments needed to support changes in other parts of TIGCC may be made. Nevertheless, it is relatively stable and complete.
 KTIGCC - KTIGCC is complete, i.e. all the features of the TIGCC IDE are also available in KTIGCC. Additional features may be added in the future. It is at version 1.10 (January 17, 2009).
 The compiler - TIGCC's compiler is based on the GNU Compiler Collection (GCC). The latest released version of TIGCC's compiler is based on the GCC 4.1.2-20060728 snapshot.

Due to disputes between a small group of users and the current maintainer, a fork named GCC4TI was announced  on January 3, 2009. It currently has 2 active committers.

TIGCC team
The TIGCC project was originally developed by an international team of developers , most of whom have since resigned due to lack of time and/or interest. It is currently being maintained by Kevin Kofler.

 Xavier Vassor: from the Doors Team. He was the creator of the TIGCC project. He made the original linker, which has since been replaced.
 Jean Canazzi: was the first maintainer of the compiler and made changes that were necessary to interface with the TIOS properly.
 Niklas Brunlid: who fixed some bugs in the old linker.
 Zeljko Juric: made the first version of the TIGCC library. His documentation constitutes a large portion of TIGCC's current documentation.
 Sebastian Reichelt: is the developer of the TIGCC IDE written in Delphi, and did some maintenance on the compiler.
 Philipp Winkler: made the HTML version of the documentation.
 Kevin Kofler: is the current maintainer of the TIGCC project.

As in many free software projects, several more people contributed small amounts of code to TIGCC.

Related programming tools
There are tools which may aid programmers using TIGCC.
 TiEmu is a m68k TI graphing calculator emulator.
 TiLP is an alternative linking program to TI-Connect that works on Windows, Linux, FreeBSD and on Mac OS X.
 Virtual TI was the first TI graphing calculator emulator supporting the TI-89 and the TI-92 Plus, at first in a separate version called VTI68k, which was later merged into Virtual TI itself. As it is really old and not maintained anymore, and also lacks a C debugger, the TIGCC Team recommends  using TiEmu instead.

See also
HPGCC (a similar project for HP calculators)

External links
 The official TIGCC web site

Graphing calculator software
Texas Instruments calculators
Free integrated development environments
Pascal (programming language) software